Košarkaški klub Radnički, commonly referred to as KK Radnički Kragujevac, was a men's professional basketball club, last based in Kragujevac, Serbia.

The club was founded in Vršac in 1994 and was in 2009 relocated to Kragujevac.

History

Early years
The club was founded on 4 April 1994 in Vršac as KK Kondivik. It began at the very bottom, competing in the lowest level of basketball pyramid in FR Yugoslavia.

Swisslion Takovo
In 2001, after gaining promotion to the First Serbian league (third-tier competition in the country), along with securing a sponsorship from the Swisslion Takovo confectionery company, Kondivik changed its name to KK Lions. Under that name the greatest progress in club's history began, achieving promotion in three competition ranks in the period of three years.

In 2004 the club placed first in the league and changed the name again this time to KK Swisslion Takovo. After the same season, after the reorganization of the league loses the first league status which returns already in 2006.

In the 2007–08 and 2008–09 seasons, the club won the top spot in the basketball league of Serbia in superior fashion, thus gaining a spot in the Superliga as well as the national cup (Kup Radivoja Koraća) finals.

Radnički Kragujevac
After winning the qualification playoff series over KK Vojvodina 3–0, the club got a spot in the Adriatic League. KK Swisslion Takovo was supposed to move from Vršac to Gornji Milanovac. However, the club's longtime sponsor, Swisslion Takovo company withdrew their investment in the club before the start of the debut season in the Adriatic League. According to the word of that time president of the ABA league, Gornji Milanovac does not meet the requirements in the field of hotel accommodation (because the main hotel bankrupted) and changed ABA League basketball rules about basketball terrain.  Hand of rescue to the team was provided by the City of Kragujevac, specifically the city's mayor Veroljub Stevanović and his associates. The club relocated to Kragujevac on October 21, 2009, was given the name of the famous club that already existed in the city - KK Radnički.

During the debut 2009–10 season, Radnički was the "biggest surprise" in regional and national competitions. In the Adriatic League, the club had seized the 11th position with 11 wins and 15 defeats.

For the 2010–11 season, Radnički was considered the favorite in almost every game in Kragujevac. The results were better than the previous year so and the club won the 10th place.

Names of the club through history

Home arena

Hala Jezero (Serbian Cyrillic: Хала Језеро, English: The Jezero Hall) is a multi-purpose indoor arena located in the city of Kragujevac. It was the home ground of basketball club Radnički and has a capacity of 5,320 seats.

Supporters

Crveni Djavoli (Serbian Cyrillic: Црвени Ђаволи, English: The Red Devils) or Djavoli are the organized supporters of the Kragujevac based football club Radnički Kragujevac. Besides football club, they also support other sport sections of the Radnički Kragujevac Sport Association.

Players

Coaches

Lions/Swisslion Vršac (2001–2009)
 Zoran Todorović (2001–2003)
 Miroslav Popov (2003–2004)
 Milovan Stepandić (2004)
 Miodrag Baletić (2004–2005)
 Aleksandar Bućan (2005)
 Srećko Sekulović (2005–2006)
 Boško Đokić (2006–2007)
 Dejan Mijatović (2007–2009)
Radnički Kragujevac (2009–2014)
 Miroslav Nikolić (2009–2014)

Season-by-season

Trophies and awards

Trophies 
 First B League of Serbia and Montenegro (2nd-tier)
Winners (1) – 2005–06

Awards
ABA League MVP
 David Simon – 2011–12
 Aleksandar Ćapin – 2012–13

ABA League Top Scorer
 Michael Lee – 2010–11
 David Simon – 2011–12
 Aleksandar Ćapin – 2012–13

Notable players

  Boban Marjanović
  Dragan Milosavljević
  Nenad Miljenović
  Miljan Pavković
  Nikola Kalinić
  Marko Marinović
  Danilo Mijatović
  Stefan Sinovec
  Stefan Birčević
  Stefan Jović
  Bojan Krstović
  Sava Lešić
  Marko Brkić
  Miloš Dimić
  Nikola Jevtović
  Uroš Nikolić
  Nenad Šulović
  Uroš Lučić
  Ratko Varda
  Dušan Katnić
  Predrag Miletić
  Miloš Janković
  Mladen Pantić
  Vladimir Vuksanović
  Strahinja Stojačić
  Vladan Vukosavljević
  Filip Šepa
  Saša Bratić
  Vukašin Aleksić
  Duško Bunić
  Marko Čakarević
  Vladislav Dragojlović
  Nenad Mišanović
  Miljan Rakić
  Radenko Pilčević
  Dušan Knežević
  Aleksandar Ćapin
  Aleksej Nešović
  Steven Marković
  Mark Worthington
  Matthew Bryan-Amaning
  Yunus Çankaya
  Miloš Borisov
  Boris Bakić
  Aleksei Kotishevskiy
  Anton Gaddefors
  Mouphtaou Yarou
  Dušan Mlađan
  Terrico White
  Michael Lee
  Michael Scott
  D. J. Seeley
  Kyle Visser
  David Simon

International record

References

External links
  
 KK Radnički Kragujevac at abaliga.com
 KK Radnički Kragujevac at eurobasket.com
 KK Radnički Kragujevac at Facebook
 Swisslion Takovo at srbijasport.net

 
Radnicki Kragujevac
Basketball teams established in 1994
Basketball teams disestablished in 2014
Sport in Kragujevac
Sport in Vršac